Stanislav Brebera (10 August 1925 – 11 May 2012) was a Czech chemist.
He was born in Přelouč and died in Pardubice.

Brebera spent his career in Czechoslovakian state-hold Research Institute for Chemical Industry, currently Explosia Pardubice.  He is best known for the developing the plastic explosive known as Semtex in the late 1950s, which was put on the market in 1964.

References 

Czech inventors
Czech chemists
1925 births
2012 deaths
People from Přelouč